The Web platform is a collection of technologies developed as open standards by the World Wide Web Consortium and other standardization bodies such as the Web Hypertext Application Technology Working Group, the Unicode Consortium, the Internet Engineering Task Force, and Ecma International. It is the umbrella term introduced by the World Wide Web Consortium, and in 2011 it was defined as "a platform for innovation, consolidation and cost efficiencies" by W3C CEO Jeff Jaffe. Being built on The evergreen Web (where rapid, automatic software updates, vendor co-operation, standardization, and competition take place) has allowed for the addition of new capabilities while addressing security and privacy risks. Additionally, developers are enabled to build interoperable content on a cohesive platform.

The Web platform includes technologies—computer languages and APIs—that were originally created in relation to the publication of Web pages.  This includes HTML, CSS, SVG, MathML, WAI-ARIA, ECMAScript, WebGL, Web Storage, Indexed Database API, Web Components, WebAssembly, WebGPU, Web Workers, WebSocket, Geolocation API, Server-Sent Events, DOM Events, Media Fragments, XMLHttpRequest, Cross-Origin Resource Sharing, File API, RDFa, WOFF, HTTP, TLS 1.2, and IRI.

See also 
 Open Web Foundation (OWF)
 Responsive web design (RWD)
 Web standards
 WebPlatform.org

References

Computer-related introductions in 2010
HTML5
World Wide Web Consortium standards